Ema Nudar Umanu is a 2018 East Timorese experimental fantasy film written and directed by Thomas Henning, an Australian filmmaker, and Jonas Rusumalay Diaz, who is also its producer. It is the first feature film of the film collective Malkriadu Cinema, and is among the first feature films to be produced by East Timor, after Beatriz's War and Abdul & José. The film premiered at the Melbourne International Film Festival on 16 August 2018.

Cast
Apo Quintao as Tokadór
Lola Bety Pires as the Spirit ("Mate-klamar")
Tuta Monteiro Pires as Ela
Juvencio da Silva Correia as Amanu

References

External links

2018 films
2010s avant-garde and experimental films
2018 fantasy films
2010s ghost films
East Timorese films
Films about the afterlife
Tetum-language films